Doolandella is an outer western suburb in the City of Brisbane, Queensland, Australia.

Geography
Blunder Creek forms the eastern and southern boundaries of the suburb.

The suburb has access to the Ipswich Motorway via Blunder Road as well as the Logan Motorway to the south.

History
Doolandella was declared as an official suburb in 1976.  The name Doolandella, or Dulandella as expressed by Aboriginal Australians, is a Yuggera word referring to the Geebung tree, a broad leaved shrub with yellow fruit which grows in the area.

In 2004, a total of 70 houses with a population of 255 was recorded in the suburb.

The median age of the Doolandella population was 30 years of age, 7 years below the Australian median. 55.6% of people living in Doolandella were born in Australia, compared to the national average of 69.8%; the next most common countries of birth were Vietnam 11.9%, New Zealand 5.6%, India 2.9%, England 2.1%, Fiji 1.7%. 53.3% of people spoke only English at home; the next most popular languages were 19.5% Vietnamese, 2.7% Samoan, 2.3% Hindi, 2.1% Mandarin, 1.9% Spanish.

Education 
There are no schools within the suburb. There are primary schools in the neighbouring suburbs of Inala, Durack, Pallara, and Forest Lake and secondary schools in Durack and Forest Lake.

References

External links

University of Queensland: Queensland Places: Doolandella

Suburbs of the City of Brisbane